Southern Regional Technical College (SRTC) is a public community college in Moultrie, Georgia. Southern Regional Technical College is a unit of the Technical College System of Georgia. The college provides learning opportunities through quality technical education programs and services.

History
In the fall of 1964, the original building of Moultrie Area Vocational-Technical School was constructed at a cost of $325,000.  The school opened its doors to 40 students, a staff of nine, and five programs of study; automotive mechanics, diesel mechanics, machine shop, drafting and design technology, and electronics.  Mr. W. W. Hobbs was named director.  The following year, heating and air conditioning, accounting, secretarial and clerical programs were added.  Full-time enrollment increased to 100.  In 1966, the welding program was added, and full-time enrollment increased to 180.  By 1969, cosmetology, practical nursing, telecommunication, and mathematics programs were added.  At this time, full-time enrollment had increased to 280.

Today
In July 2015, Moultrie Technical College merged with Southwest Georgia Technical College to become the new Southern Regional Technical College. The combined college serves seven counties with campuses located in each area.  These counties include Colquitt, Tift, Turner and Worth Thomas, Grady, Mitchel.  The college’s doors now open to 4,000 students, a staff of 230 plus employees and more than 150 degree, diploma and certificate programs.
Southern Regional main campus is in Thomasville
Industrial Drive (auxiliary) campus in Moultrie
Tifton campus in Tifton
Turner County campus in Ashburn (transferred from East Central Technical College in 2001)
Worth County campus in Sylvester

Accredited programs
Moultrie Technical College is accredited by the Southern Association of Colleges and Schools. Specific program accreditations and certifications include:

The Automotive Technology program is accredited by ASE National Automotive Technicians Education Foundation, Inc.
Cosmetology graduates are eligible to take the Georgia State Board of Cosmetology Examination.
Emergency Medical Technician graduates are eligible to sit for the National Registry Intermediate Exam, which will give them both state and national certification.
The Medical Assisting program is accredited by the Commission on Accreditation of Allied Health Education Programs
Patient Care Assisting program graduates are eligible to become certified as CNA's and to be registered with the Georgia Nurse Aide Registry.
Practical Nursing graduates are eligible to take the State Board Examination administered by the Georgia Board of Examiners of Licensed Practical Nurses.
The Radiologic Technology program is accredited by the Joint Review Commission on Education in Radiologic Technology.
The Surgical Technology program is accredited by the Commission on Accreditation of Allied Health Education Programs (CAAHEP).

Current programs
These are the current programs offered at MTC:

External links
Moultrie Technical College website

Vocational education in the United States
Technical College System of Georgia
Two-year colleges in the United States
Education in Colquitt County, Georgia
Education in Tift County, Georgia
Education in Turner County, Georgia
Education in Worth County, Georgia
Educational institutions established in 1964
Buildings and structures in Colquitt County, Georgia
Buildings and structures in Tift County, Georgia
Buildings and structures in Turner County, Georgia
Buildings and structures in Worth County, Georgia
Educational institutions accredited by the Council on Occupational Education
1964 establishments in Georgia (U.S. state)